Marco Antonio Rubio (born May 28, 1971) is an American politician and lawyer serving as the senior United States senator from Florida, a seat he has held since 2011. A member of the Republican Party, he served as Speaker of the Florida House of Representatives from 2006 to 2008. Rubio unsuccessfully sought the Republican nomination for President of the United States in 2016, winning presidential primaries in Minnesota, the District of Columbia, and Puerto Rico.

Rubio is a Cuban American from Miami, Florida. After serving as a city commissioner for West Miami in the 1990s, he was elected to represent the 111th district in the Florida House of Representatives in 2000. Subsequently, he was elected speaker of the Florida House; he served for two years beginning in November 2006. Upon leaving the Florida legislature in 2008 due to term limits, Rubio taught at Florida International University.

Rubio was elected to the U.S. Senate in 2010. In April 2015, he decided to run for president instead of seeking reelection to the Senate. He suspended his campaign for the presidency on March 15, 2016, after losing the Florida Republican primary to the eventual winner of the presidential election, Donald Trump. He then decided to run for reelection to the Senate, winning a second term later that year. During the 2016 Republican presidential primary campaign in which Rubio and Trump were opponents, Rubio was critical of Trump. Rubio ultimately endorsed Trump before the 2016 general election and was largely supportive of Trump during his presidency. Due to his influence on U.S. policy on Latin America during the Trump administration, he was described as a "virtual secretary of state for Latin America". Rubio was reelected to a third term in 2022, defeating Democratic nominee Val Demings.

Early life and education
 
Marco Antonio Rubio was born in Miami, Florida, the second son and third child of Mario Rubio Reina and Oriales (née Garcia) Rubio. His parents were Cubans who immigrated to the United States in 1956 during the regime of Fulgencio Batista, two and a half years before Fidel Castro ascended to power after the Cuban Revolution. His mother made at least four return trips to Cuba after Castro's takeover, including a month-long trip in 1961. Neither of Rubio's parents was a U.S. citizen at the time of Rubio's birth, but his parents applied for U.S. citizenship and were naturalized in 1975. Some relatives of Rubio's were admitted to the U.S. as refugees.

Rubio's maternal grandfather, Pedro Victor Garcia, immigrated to the U.S. legally in 1956, but returned to Cuba to find work in 1959. When he fled communist Cuba and returned to the U.S. in 1962 without a visa, he was detained as an undocumented immigrant and an immigration judge ordered him to be deported. Immigration officials reversed their decision later that day, the deportation order was not enforced, and Garcia was given a legal status of "parolee" that allowed him to stay in the U.S. Garcia re-applied for permanent resident status in 1966 following passage of the Cuban Adjustment Act, at which point his residency was approved. Rubio enjoyed a close relationship with his grandfather during his childhood.

In October 2011, The Washington Post reported that Rubio's previous statements that his parents were forced to leave Cuba in 1959 (after Fidel Castro came to power) were falsehoods. His parents actually left Cuba in 1956, during the dictatorship of Fulgencio Batista. According to the Post, "[in] Florida, being connected to the post-revolution exile community gives a politician cachet that could never be achieved by someone identified with the pre-Castro exodus, a group sometimes viewed with suspicion." Rubio denied that he had embellished his family history, stating that his public statements about his family were based on "family lore". Rubio asserted that his parents intended to return to Cuba in the 1960s. He added that his mother took his two elder siblings back to Cuba in 1961 with the intention of living there permanently (his father remained behind in Miami "wrapping up the family's matters"), but the nation's move toward communism caused the family to change its plans. Rubio stated that "[the] essence of my family story is why they came to America in the first place; and why they had to stay."

Rubio has three siblings: older brother Mario, older sister Barbara (married to Orlando Cicilia), and younger sister Veronica (formerly married to entertainer Carlos Ponce). Growing up, his family was Catholic, though from age8 to age11 he and his family attended the Church of Jesus Christ of Latter-day Saints while living in Las Vegas. During those years in Nevada, his father worked as a bartender at Sam's Town Hotel and his mother as a housekeeper at the Imperial Palace Hotel and Casino. He received his first communion as a Catholic in 1984 before moving back to Miami with his family a year later. He was confirmed and later married in the Catholic Church.

Rubio attended South Miami Senior High School, graduating in 1989. He attended Tarkio College in Missouri for one year on a football scholarship before enrolling at Santa Fe Community College (now Santa Fe College) in Gainesville, Florida. He earned his Bachelor of Arts degree in political science from the University of Florida in 1993 and his Juris Doctor cum laude from the University of Miami School of Law in 1996. Rubio has said that he incurred $100,000 in student loans. He paid off those loans in 2012.

Early career 
While studying law, Rubio interned for U.S. Representative Ileana Ros-Lehtinen. He also worked on Republican senator Bob Dole's 1996 presidential campaign. In April 1998, two years after finishing law school, Rubio was elected to a seat as city commissioner for West Miami. He became a member of the Florida House of Representatives in early 2000.

Florida House of Representatives

Elections and concurrent employment
In late 1999, a special election was called to fill the seat for the 111th House District in the Florida House of Representatives, representing Miami. It was considered a safe Republican seat, so Rubio's main challenge was to win the GOP nomination. He campaigned as a moderate, advocating tax cuts and early childhood education.

Rubio placed second in the Republican primary on December 14, 1999, but won the runoff election for the Republican nomination, defeating Angel Zayon (a television and radio reporter who was popular with Cuban exiles) by just 64 votes. He then defeated Democrat Anastasia Garcia with 72% of the vote in a January 25, 2000, special election.

In November 2000, Rubio was reelected unopposed. In 2002, he was reelected to a second term unopposed. In 2004, he was reelected to a third term with 66% of the vote. In 2006, he was reelected to a fourth term unopposed.

Rubio spent almost nine years in the Florida House of Representatives. Since the Florida legislative session officially lasted only sixty days, he spent about half of each year in Miami, where he practiced law, first at a law firm that specialized in land use and zoning until 2014 when he took a position with Broad and Cassel, a Miami law and lobbying firm (though state law precluded him from engaging in lobbying or introducing legislation on behalf of the firm's clients).

Tenure

When Rubio took his seat in the legislature in Tallahassee in January 2000, voters in Florida had recently approved a constitutional amendment on term limits. This created openings for new legislative leaders due to many senior incumbents having to retire. According to an article in National Journal, Rubio also gained an extra advantage in that regard, because he was sworn in early due to the special election, and he would take advantage of these opportunities to join the GOP leadership.

Majority whip and majority leader
Later in 2000, the majority leader of the House, Mike Fasano, promoted Rubio to be one of two majority whips. National Journal described that position as typically requiring a lot of arm-twisting, but said Rubio took a different approach that relied more on persuading legislators and less on coercing them.

Fasano resigned in September 2001 as majority leader of the House due to disagreements with the House speaker, and the speaker passed over Rubio to appoint a more experienced replacement for Fasano. Rubio volunteered to work on redistricting, which he accomplished by dividing the state into five regions, then working individually with the lawmakers involved, and this work helped to cement his relationships with GOP leaders.

In December 2002, Rubio was appointed House majority leader by Speaker Johnnie Byrd. He persuaded Speaker Byrd to restructure the job of majority leader, so that legislative wrangling would be left to the whip's office, and Rubio would become the main spokesperson for the House GOP.

According to National Journal, during this period Rubio did not entirely adhere to doctrinaire conservative principles, and some colleagues described him as a centrist "who sought out Democrats and groups that don’t typically align with the GOP". He co-sponsored legislation that would have let farmworkers sue growers in state court if they were shortchanged on pay, and co-sponsored a bill for giving in-state tuition rates to the children of undocumented immigrants. In the wake of the September 11 attacks, he voiced suspicion about expanding police detention powers and helped defeat a GOP bill that would have required colleges to increase reporting to the state about foreign students.

As a state representative, Rubio requested legislative earmarks (called "Community Budget Issue Requests" in Florida), totaling about $145million for 2001 and 2002, but none thereafter. Additionally, an office in the executive branch compiled a longer list of spending requests by legislators, including Rubio, as did the non-profit group Florida TaxWatch. Many of those listed items were for health and social programs that Rubio has described as "the kind of thing that legislators would get attacked on if we didn't fund them". A 2010 report by the Tampa Bay Times and Miami Herald said that some of Rubio's spending requests dovetailed with his personal interests. For example, Rubio requested a $20million appropriation for Jackson Memorial Hospital to subsidize care for the poor and uninsured, and Rubio later did work for that hospital as a consultant. A spokesman for Rubio has said that the items in question helped the whole county, that Rubio did not lobby to get them approved, that the hospital money was necessary and non-controversial, and that Rubio is "a limited-government conservative... not a no-government conservative".

House speaker
On September 13, 2005, at age 34, Rubio became speaker after State Representatives Dennis Baxley, Jeff Kottkamp, and Dennis A. Ross dropped out. He was sworn in a year later, in November 2006. He became the first Cuban American to be speaker of the Florida House of Representatives, and would remain speaker until November 2008.

When he was chosen as future speaker in 2005, Rubio delivered a speech to the House in which he asked members to look in their desks, where they each found a hardcover book titled 100 Innovative Ideas For Florida's Future; but the book was blank because it had not yet been written, and Rubio told his colleagues that they would fill in the pages together with the help of ordinary Floridians. In 2006, after traveling around the state and talking with citizens, and compiling their ideas, Rubio published the book. The National Journal called this book "the centerpiece of Rubio's early speakership". About 24 of the "ideas" became law, while another 10 were partially enacted. Among the items from his 2006 book that became law were multiple-year car registrations, a requirement that high schools provide more vocational courses, and an expanded voucher-like school-choice program. Rubio's defenders, and some critics, point out that nationwide economic difficulties overlapped with much of Rubio's speakership, and so funding new legislative proposals became difficult.

As Rubio took office as Speaker, Jeb Bush was completing his term as governor, and Bush left office in January 2007. Rubio hired 18 Bush aides, leading capitol insiders to say the speaker's suite was "the governor's office in exile". An article in National Journal described Rubio's style as being very different from Bush's; where Bush was a very assertive manager of affairs in Tallahassee, Rubio's style was to delegate certain powers, relinquish others, and invite political rivals into his inner circle. As the incoming speaker, he decided to open a private dining room for legislators, which he said would give members more privacy, free from being pursued by lobbyists, though the expense led to a public relations problem.

In 2006, Florida enacted into law limitations upon the authority of the state government to take private property, in response to the 2005 Supreme Court decision in Kelo v. City of New London which took a broad view of governmental power to take private property under eminent domain. This state legislation had been proposed by a special committee chaired by Rubio prior to his speakership.

Jeb Bush was succeeded by Charlie Crist, a moderate Republican who took office in January 2007. Rubio and Crist clashed frequently. Their sharpest clash involved the governor's initiative to expand casino gambling in Florida. Rubio sued Crist for bypassing the Florida Legislature in order to make a deal with the Seminole Tribe. The Florida Supreme Court sided with Rubio and blocked the deal.

Rubio also was a critic of Crist's strategy to fight climate change through an executive order creating new automobile and utility emissions standards. Rubio accused Crist of imposing "European-style big government mandates", and the legislature under Rubio's leadership weakened the impact of Crist's climate change initiative. Rubio said that Crist's approach would harm consumers by driving up utility bills without having much effect upon the environment, and that a better approach would be to promote biofuel (e.g. ethanol), solar panels, and energy efficiency.

Rubio introduced a plan to reduce state property taxes to 2001 levels (and potentially eliminate them altogether), while increasing sales taxes by 1% to 2.5% to fund schools. The proposal would have reduced property taxes in the state by $40–50billion. His proposal passed the House, but was opposed by Governor Crist and Florida Senate Republicans, who said that the increase in sales tax would disproportionately affect the poor. So, Rubio agreed to smaller changes, and Crist's proposal to double the state's property tax exemption from $25,000 to $50,000 (for a tax reduction estimated by Crist to be $33billion) ultimately passed. Legislators called it the largest tax cut in Florida's history up until then. At the time, Republican anti-tax activist Grover Norquist described Rubio as "the most pro-taxpayer legislative leader in the country".

As Speaker, Rubio "aggressively tried to push Florida to the political right", according to NBC News, and frequently clashed with the Florida Senate, which was run by more moderate Republicans, and with then-Governor Charlie Crist, a centrist Republican at the time. Although a conservative, "behind the scenes many Democrats considered Rubio someone with whom they could work," according to biographer Manuel Roig-Franzia. Dan Gelber of Miami, the House Democratic leader at the time of Rubio's speakership, considered him "a true conservative" but not "a reflexive partisan", saying: "He didn't have an objection to working with the other side simply because they were the other side. To put it bluntly, he wasn't a jerk." Gelber considered Rubio "a severe conservative, really far to the right, but probably the most talented spokesman the severe right could ever hope for."

While speaker of the Florida House, Rubio shared a residence in Tallahassee with another Florida State Representative, David Rivera, which the two co-owned. The house later went into foreclosure in 2010 after several missed mortgage payments. At that point, Rubio assumed responsibility for the payments, and the house was eventually sold.

In 2007, Florida state senator Tony Hill (D-Jacksonville), chairman of the state legislature's Black Caucus, requested that the legislature apologize for slavery, and Rubio said the idea merited discussion. The following year, a supportive Rubio said such apologies can be important albeit symbolic; he pointed out that even in 2008 young African-American males "believe that the American dream is not available to them". He helped set up a council on issues facing black men and boys, persuaded colleagues to replicate the Harlem Children's Zone in the Miami neighborhood of Liberty City, and supported efforts to promote literacy and mentoring for black children and others.

In 2010 during Rubio's Senate campaign, and again in 2015 during his presidential campaign, issues were raised by the media and his political opponents about some items charged by Rubio to his Republican Party of Florida American Express card during his time as House speaker. Rubio charged about $110,000 during those two years, of which $16,000 was personal expenses unrelated to party business, such as groceries and plane tickets. Rubio said that he personally paid American Express more than $16,000 for these personal expenses. In 2012, the Florida Commission on Ethics cleared Rubio of wrongdoing in his use of the party-issued credit card, although the commission inspector said that Rubio exhibited a "level of negligence" in not using his personal MasterCard. In November 2015, Rubio released his party credit card statements for January 2005 through October 2006, which showed eight personal charges totaling $7,243.74, all of which he had personally reimbursed, in most instances by the next billing period. When releasing the charge records, Rubio spokesman Todd Harris said, "These statements are more than 10 years old. And the only people who ask about them today are the liberal media and our political opponents. We are releasing them now because Marco has nothing to hide."

Professorship
After leaving the Florida Legislature in 2008, Rubio began teaching under a fellowship appointment at Florida International University (FIU) as an adjunct professor. In 2011, after entering the U.S. Senate, he rejoined the FIU faculty. Rubio teaches in the Department of Politics and International Relations, which is part of FIU's Steven J. Green School of International and Public Affairs. He has taught undergraduate courses on Florida politics, political parties, and legislative politics.

Rubio's appointment as an FIU professor was initially criticized. The university obtained considerable state funding when Rubio was speaker of the Florida House, and many other university jobs were being eliminated due to funding issues at the time FIU appointed him to the faculty. When Rubio accepted the fellowship appointment as an adjunct professor at FIU, he agreed to raise most of the funding for his position from private sources.

U.S. Senate

Elections

2010

On May 5, 2009, Rubio stated his intent to run for the U.S. Senate seat being vacated by Mel Martínez, who had decided not to seek reelection and subsequently resigned before completing his term. Before launching his campaign, Rubio met with fundraisers and supporters throughout the state. Initially trailing by double digits in the primary against the incumbent governor of his own party, Charlie Crist, Rubio eventually surpassed Crist in polling for the Republican nomination. In his campaign, Rubio received the support of members of the Tea Party, many of whom were dissatisfied with Crist's policies as governor. On April 28, 2010, Crist said he would run without a party affiliation, effectively ceding the Republican nomination to Rubio. Several of Crist's top fundraisers, as well as Republican leadership, refused to support Crist after Rubio won the Republican nomination.

On November 2, 2010, Rubio won the general election with 49% of the vote to Crist's 30% and Democrat Kendrick Meek's 20%. When Rubio was sworn in to the U.S. Senate, he and Bob Menendez of New Jersey were the only two Latino Americans in the Senate.

2016

In April 2015, Rubio decided to run for president instead of seeking reelection to the Senate. After suspending his presidential campaign on March 15, 2016, Rubio "seemed to open the door to running for reelection" on June 13, 2016, citing the previous day's Orlando nightclub shooting and how "it really gives you pause, to think a little bit about your service to your country and where you can be most useful to your country." Rubio officially started his campaign nine days later, on June 22. Rubio won the Republican primary on August 30, 2016, defeating Carlos Beruff. He faced Democratic nominee Patrick Murphy in the general election, defeating him with almost 52% of the vote.

2022

In November 2020, Rubio announced he would run for a third Senate term in the 2022 election. He faced Democratic challenger Val Demings, the U.S. Representative for Florida's 10th congressional district and a former police officer. Rubio criticized Demings as an "ineffective member of Congress and a puppet of Nancy Pelosi; she's voted with Nancy Pelosi 100% of the time". Demings criticized Rubio's attendance record in the Senate, and in a campaign ad said Rubio had "one of the worst attendance records in the Senate. When Florida needs you, you just don't show up." Demings also claimed that Rubio supported tax hikes, but this was proven false. Rubio won the November 8 general election with 57% of the vote to Demings's 41%.

Tenure as senator
During Rubio's first four years in the U.S. Senate, Republicans were in the minority. After the 2014 midterm elections, the Republicans obtained majority control of the Senate, giving Rubio and the Republicans vast federal influence during the final two years of Barack Obama's presidency, as well as during all four years of Donald Trump's presidency. After the 2020 elections, the Democrats regained majority control of the Senate, and Rubio has reassumed minority status within the Senate.

2011–2015

Shortly after taking office in 2011, Rubio said he had no interest in running for president or vice president in the 2012 presidential election. In March 2012, when he endorsed Mitt Romney for president, Rubio said that he did not expect to be or want to be selected as a vice presidential running mate, but was vetted for vice president by the Romney campaign. Former Romney aide Beth Myers has said that the vetting process turned up nothing disqualifying about Rubio.

Upon taking office, Rubio hired Cesar Conda as his chief of staff. Conda, a former adviser to Vice President Dick Cheney, and former top aide to Sens. Spencer Abraham (R-Mich.) and Robert Kasten (R-Wis.), was succeeded in 2014 as Rubio's chief of staff by his deputy, Alberto Martinez, but Conda remained as a part-time adviser.

During his first year in office, Rubio became an influential defender of the United States embargo against Cuba and induced the State Department to withdraw an ambassadorial nomination of Jonathan D. Farrar, who was the Chief of Mission of the United States Interests Section in Havana from 2008 to 2011. Rubio believed that Farrar was not assertive enough toward the Castro regime. Also in 2011, Rubio was invited to visit the Reagan Library, during which he gave a well-publicized speech praising its namesake, and also rescued Nancy Reagan from falling.

In March 2011, Rubio supported U.S. participation in the military campaign in Libya to oust Libyan leader Muammar Gaddafi. He urged that Senate leaders bring "a bi-partisan resolution to the Senate floor authorizing the president's decision to participate in allied military action in Libya". The administration decided that no congressional authorization was needed under the War Powers Resolution; Senator Joe Lieberman (I-CT) joined Rubio in writing an opinion piece for The Wall Street Journal in June 2011 again urging passage of such authorization. In October 2011, Rubio joined several other senators in pushing for continued engagement to "help Libya lay the foundation for sustainable security". Soon after Gadhafi was ousted, Rubio warned there was a serious threat posed by the spread of militias and weapons, and called for more U.S. involvement to counter that threat.

Rubio voted against the Budget Control Act of 2011, which included mandatory automatic budget cuts from sequestration. He later said that defense spending should never have been linked to taxes and the deficit, calling the policy a "terrible idea" based on a "false choice".

The following month, Rubio and Senator Chris Coons, Democrat of Delaware, co-sponsored the American Growth, Recovery, Empowerment and Entrepreneurship Act (AGREE Act), which would have extended many tax credits and exemptions for businesses investing in research and development, equipment, and other capital; provided a tax credit for veterans who start a business franchise; allowed an increase in immigration for certain types of work visas; and strengthened copyright protections.

Rubio voted against the 2012 "fiscal cliff" resolutions. Although he received some criticism for this position, he responded: "Thousands of small businesses, not just the wealthy, will now be forced to decide how they'll pay this new tax, and, chances are, they'll do it by firing employees, cutting back their hours and benefits, or postponing the new hires they were looking to make. And to make matters worse, it does nothing to bring our dangerous debt under control."

In 2013, Rubio was part of the bipartisan "Gang of Eight" senators that crafted comprehensive immigration reform legislation. Rubio proposed a plan providing a path to citizenship for undocumented immigrants currently living in the United States involving payment of fines and back taxes, background checks, and a probationary period; that pathway was to be implemented only after strengthening border security. The bill passed the Senate 68 to 32 with his support, but Rubio then signaled that the bill should not be taken up by the House because other priorities, like repealing Obamacare, were a higher priority for him; the House never did take up the bill. Rubio has since explained that he still supports reform, but a different approach instead of a single comprehensive bill.

Rubio was chosen to deliver the Republican response to President Obama's 2013 State of the Union Address. It marked the first time the response was delivered in English and Spanish. Rubio's attempt to draw a strong line against the looming defense sequestration was undercut by fellow Republican senator Rand Paul's additional response to Obama's speech that called for the sequester to be carried out.

In April 2013, Rubio voted against an expansion of background checks for gun purchases, contending that such increased regulatory measures would do little to help capture criminals.
Rubio voted against publishing the Senate Intelligence Committee report on CIA torture. In 2016, Rubio said the U.S. should "find out everything they know" from captured terrorists and should not telegraph "the enemy what interrogation techniques we will or won't use."

2015–2021

Republicans took control of the U.S. Senate as a result of the elections in November 2014. As this new period of Republican control began, Rubio pushed for the elimination of the "risk corridors" used by the federal government to compensate insurers for their losses as part of the Patient Protection and Affordable Care Act (PPACA). The risk corridors were intended to be funded by profitable insurers participating in the PPACA, but since insurer losses have significantly exceeded their profits in the program, the risk corridors have been depleted. His efforts contributed to the inclusion of a provision in the 2014 federal budget that prevented other funding sources from being tapped to replenish the risk corridors.

In March 2015, Rubio and Senator Mike Lee, Republican of Utah, proposed a tax plan that according to The Wall Street Journal, combined thinking from "old-fashioned, Reagan-era supply-siders" and a "breed of largely younger conservative reform thinkers" concerned with the tax burden on the middle class. The plan would lower the top corporate income tax rate from 38% to 25%, eliminate taxes on capital gains, dividends, and inherited estates, and create a new child tax credit worth up to $2,500 per child. The plan would set the top individual income tax rate at 35%. It also included a proposal to replace the means-tested welfare system, including food stamps and the Earned Income Tax Credit, with a new "consolidated system of benefits".

According to analysis by Vocativ as reported by Fox News, Rubio missed 8.3% of total votes from January 2011 to February 2015. From October 27, 2014, to October 26, 2015, Rubio voted in 74% of Senate votes, according to an analysis by GovTrack.us, which tracks congressional voting records. In 2015, Rubio was absent for about 35% of Senate votes. In historical context Rubio's attendance record for Senate votes is not exceptional among senators seeking a presidential nomination; John McCain missed a much higher percentage of votes in 2007. But it was the worst of the three senators who campaigned for the presidency in 2015.

During his Senate tenure, Rubio has co-sponsored bills on issues ranging from humanitarian crises in Haiti to the Russian incursion into Ukraine, and was a frequent and prominent critic of Obama's efforts in national security.

On May 17, 2016, Rubio broke from the Republican majority in his support of Obama's request for $2 billion in emergency spending on the Zika virus at a time when Florida accounted for roughly 20% of the recorded cases of Zika in the U.S., acknowledging that it was the president's request but adding, "it's really the scientists' request, the doctors' request, the public health sector's request for how to address this issue." On August 6, Rubio said he did not believe in terminating Zika-infected pregnancies.

On December 13, after President-elect Trump nominated Rex Tillerson as his Secretary of State in the incoming administration, Rubio expressed concern about the selection. On January 11, Rubio questioned Tillerson during a Senate committee hearing on his confirmation, saying afterward he would "do what's right". On January 23, Rubio said that he would vote to confirm Tillerson, saying that a delay in the appointment would be counter to national interests.

On April 5, 2017, Rubio said Bashar al-Assad felt he could act with "impunity" in knowing the United States was not prioritizing removing him from office. The next day, Rubio praised Trump's ordered strike: "By acting decisively against the very facility from which Assad launched his murderous chemical weapons attack, President Trump has made it clear to Assad and those who empower him that the days of committing war crimes with impunity are over."

In September 2017, Rubio defended Trump's decision to rescind the Deferred Action for Childhood Arrivals program. He called the program, which provided temporary stay for some undocumented immigrants brought into the U.S. as minors, "unconstitutional".

In the first session of the 115th United States Congress, Rubio was ranked the tenth most bipartisan senator by the Bipartisan Index, published by The Lugar Center and Georgetown's McCourt School of Public Policy.

While ballots were being counted in a close Florida Senate race between Democratic incumbent Bill Nelson and Republican challenger Rick Scott, Rubio claimed without evidence that Democrats were conspiring with election officials to illicitly install Nelson. He claimed without evidence that "Democrat lawyers" were descending on Florida and that "they have been very clear they aren't here to make sure every vote is counted." He claimed that Broward County officials were engaged in "ongoing" legal violations, without specifying what those were. Election monitors found no evidence of voter fraud in Broward County, and the Florida State Department found no evidence of criminal activity.

In 2019, Rubio defended Trump's decision to host the G7 conference at the Trump National Doral Miami, a resort Trump owns. Rubio called the decision "great" and said it would be good for local businesses.

In 2020, Rubio supported the nomination of Judy Shelton to the Federal Reserve Board of Governors. Shelton had received bipartisan criticism over her support for the gold standard and other unorthodox monetary policy views.

After Biden defeated Trump in the 2020 presidential election and Trump made false claims of election fraud, Rubio defended Trump's right to assert said claims and challenge the election results, saying any "irregularities" and "claims of broken election laws" could not be claimed false until the courts ruled on them. Rubio later shifted his rhetoric to saying that concerns from Republican voters over "potential irregularities" in the election demanded redress. By November 23, 2020, Rubio referred to Biden as president-elect.

Rubio described the 2021 United States Capitol attack as unpatriotic and "3rd world-style anti-American anarchy". Of the rioters, Rubio said some of them were adherents "to a conspiracy theory and others got caught up in the moment. The result was a national embarrassment." After Congress was allowed to return to session, Rubio voted to certify the 2021 United States Electoral College vote count. In February 2021, Rubio voted to acquit Trump for his role in inciting the mob to storm the Capitol.

On May 28, 2021, Rubio voted against creating the January 6 commission.

Committee assignments
Rubio's committee memberships are as follows:

 Committee on Appropriations
 Committee on Small Business and Entrepreneurship
 Select Committee on Intelligence (Ranking Member)
 Committee on Foreign Relations
 Subcommittee on Western Hemisphere, Transnational Crime, Civilian Security, Democracy, Human Rights, and Global Women's Issues (Ranking Member)
 Subcommittee on East Asia, the Pacific, and International Cybersecurity Policy
 Subcommittee on State Department and USAID Management, International Operations, and Bilateral International Development
 Special Committee on Aging

Caucuses
 Senate Republican Conference

2016 presidential campaign

Rubio said in April 2014 that he would not run for reelection to the Senate if he ran for president in 2016, as Florida law prohibits a candidate from appearing twice on a ballot, but at that time he did not rule out running for either office. He later indicated that even if he would not win the Republican nomination for president, he would not run for reelection to the Senate. Also in April 2014, the departure of Cesar Conda, Rubio's chief of staff since 2011, was seen as a sign of Rubio's plans to run for president in 2016. Conda departed to lead Rubio's Reclaim America PAC as a senior adviser. Groups supporting Rubio raised over $530,000 in the first three months of 2014, most of which was spent on consultants and data analytics, in what was seen as preparations for a presidential campaign.

A poll from the WMUR/University, tracking New Hampshire Republican primary voters' sentiment, showed Rubio at the top alongside Kentucky senator Rand Paul later in 2013, but as of April 18, 2014, he had dropped to 10th place behind other Republican contenders. The poll, however, also suggested that Rubio was not disliked by the primary voters, which was thought to be positive for him if other candidates had chosen not to run. Rubio placed second among potential 2016 Republican presidential candidates in an online poll of likely voters conducted by Zogby Analytics in January 2015.

In January 2015, it was reported that Rubio had begun contacting top donors and appointing advisors for a potential 2016 run, including George Seay, who previously worked on such campaigns as Rick Perry's in 2012 and Mitt Romney's in 2008, and Jim Rubright, who had previously worked for Jeb Bush, Mitt Romney, and John McCain. Rubio also instructed his aides to "prepare for a presidential campaign" prior to a Team Marco 2016 fundraising meeting in South Beach.

On April 13, 2015, Rubio launched his campaign for president in 2016. Rubio was believed to be a viable candidate for the 2016 presidential race who could attract many parts of the GOP base, partly because of his youthfulness and oratorical skill. Rubio had pitched his candidacy as an effort to restore the American Dream for middle and working-class families, who might have found his background as a working-class Cuban-American appealing.

Republican primaries
In the first Republican primary, the February1 Iowa caucuses, Rubio finished third, behind candidates Ted Cruz and Donald Trump. During a nationally televised debate among Republican candidates in New Hampshire on February 6, 2016, Rubio was criticized by rival Chris Christie for speaking repetitiously, with Christie saying Rubio sounded "scripted". On February 9, when he placed fifth in the New Hampshire primary results, Rubio took the blame and acknowledged a poor debate performance. In the third Republican contest, the South Carolina primary on February 20, Rubio finished second, but did not gain any delegates as Trump won all of South Carolina's congressional districts and thus delegates. Jeb Bush left the race that day, leading to a surge in campaign donations and endorsements to Rubio. On February 23, Rubio finished second in the Nevada caucuses, again losing to Trump. Trump called Rubio's remarks at the February 25 debate "robotic" due to Rubio's repeated use of the same talking points; Rubio was later followed by hecklers who were dressed as robots.

At another Republican debate on February 25, Rubio repeatedly criticized frontrunner candidate Donald Trump. It was described by CNN as a "turning point in style" as Rubio had previously largely ignored Trump during his campaign, and this deviated from Rubio's signature "optimistic campaign message". The next day Rubio continued turning Trump's attacks against him, even ridiculing Trump's physical appearance. On March 1, called 'Super Tuesday' with eleven Republican contests on that day, Rubio's sole victory was in Minnesota, the first state he had won since voting began a month prior. Rubio went on to win further contests in Puerto Rico on March6 and the District of Columbia on March 12, but lost eight other contests from March5 to 8. Around that time, Rubio revealed he was not "entirely proud" of his personal attacks on Trump.

On March 15, Rubio suspended his campaign after placing second in his own home state of Florida. Hours earlier, Rubio had expressed expectations for a Florida win, and said he would continue to campaign (in Utah) "irrespective of" that night's results. The result was that Rubio won 27.0% of the Florida vote, while Trump won 45.7% and all of Florida's delegates. The conclusion of the six March 15 contests (out of which Rubio won none) left Rubio with 169 delegates on the race to reach 1237, but Ted Cruz already had 411 and Trump 673. On March 17, Rubio ruled out runs for the vice-presidency, governorship of Florida and even reelection for his senate seat. He said only that he would be a "private citizen" by January 2017, leading to some media speculation of the termination of his political career.

After candidacy

On April 12, during an interview with Mark Levin, Rubio expressed his wishes that Republicans would nominate a conservative candidate, name-dropping Cruz. This was interpreted as an endorsement of Cruz, though Rubio clarified the following day that he had only been answering a question. Rubio would later explain his decision to not endorse Cruz being due to his belief that the endorsement would not significantly benefit him and a desire to let the election cycle play out. On April 22, Rubio said he was not interested in being the vice presidential candidate to any of the remaining GOP contenders. On May 16, Rubio posted several tweets in which he critiqued sources reporting that he despised the Senate and a Washington Post story that claimed he was unsure of his next move after his unsuccessful presidential bid, typing, "I have only said like 10000 times I will be a private citizen in January."

On May 18, after Trump expressed a willingness to meet with Kim Jong-un, Rubio said Kim was "not a stable person" and furthered that Trump was open to the meeting only due to inexperience with the North Korea leader. On May 26, Rubio told reporters that he was backing Trump due to his view that the presumptive nominee was a better choice than Hillary Clinton for the presidency and that as president, Trump would sign a repeal of the Affordable Care Act and replace the late Antonin Scalia with another conservative Supreme Court Justice. He also confirmed that he would be attending the 2016 Republican National Convention in Cleveland, Ohio, where he intended to release his pledged delegates to support Trump. On May 29, Rubio continued disavowing vice presidential speculation but indicated an interest in playing a role in Trump's campaign. On June 6, Rubio rebuked Trump's comments on Gonzalo P. Curiel, who Trump accused of being biased against him on the basis of his ethnicity, as "offensive" while speaking with reporters, advising that Trump should cease defending the remarks and defending the judge as "an American".

On July 6, Olivia Perez-Cubas, Rubio's Senate campaign spokeswoman, said he would not be attending the Republican National Convention due to planned campaigning on the days the convention was scheduled to take place.

During the Republican primary campaign in which Rubio and Donald Trump were opponents, Rubio criticized Trump, including, in February 2016, calling Trump a "con artist" and saying that Trump is "wholly unprepared to be president of the United States". In June 2016, after Trump became the presumptive GOP nominee, Rubio reaffirmed his February 2016 comments that we must not hand "the nuclear codes of the United States to an erratic individual". However, after Trump won the Republican Party's nomination, Rubio endorsed him on July 20, 2016. Following the October 7, 2016, Donald Trump Access Hollywood controversy, Rubio wrote that "Donald's comments were vulgar, egregious & impossible to justify. No one should ever talk about any woman in those terms, even in private." Rubio reaffirmed his support of Trump shortly thereafter. Two weeks later, at the annual Calle Orange street festival in downtown Orlando, he was booed off a stage by a mostly Latino crowd over his support for Trump.

Political positions

As of early 2015, Rubio had a rating of 98.67 by the American Conservative Union, based on his lifetime voting record in the Senate. According to the National Journal, in 2013 Rubio was the 17th most conservative senator. The Club for Growth gave Rubio ratings of 93 percent and 91 percent based on his voting record in 2014 and 2013 respectively, and he has a lifetime rating from the organization above 90 percent.

Rubio initially won his U.S. Senate seat with strong Tea Party backing, but his 2013 support for comprehensive immigration reform legislation led to a decline in their support for him. Rubio's stance on military, foreign policy, and national security issuessuch as his support for arming the Syrian rebels and for the NSAalienated some libertarian Tea Party activists.

Rubio supports balancing the federal budget, while prioritizing defense spending. He rejects the scientific consensus on climate change, which is that climate change is real, progressing, harmful, and primarily caused by humans, arguing that human activity does not play a major role and claiming that proposals to address climate change would be ineffective and economically harmful. He opposes the Affordable Care Act (Obamacare) and has voted to repeal it. He opposes net neutrality, a policy that requires Internet service providers to treat data on the Internet the same regardless of its source or content. Early in his Senate tenure, Rubio was involved in bipartisan negotiations to provide a pathway to citizenship for 11 million undocumented immigrants while implementing various measures to strengthen the U.S. border; the bill passed the Senate but was blocked by immigration hardliners in the House. Over time, Rubio distanced himself from his previous efforts to reach a compromise on immigration, and developed more hardline views on immigration, rejecting bipartisan immigration reform efforts in 2018.

Rubio is an outspoken opponent of abortion. He has said that he would ban it even in cases of rape and incest, but with exceptions if the mother's life is in danger.

Rubio has expressed caution about efforts to reduce penalties for drug crimes, saying that "too often" the conversation about criminal justice reform "starts and ends with drug policy". He has said that he would be open to legalizing non-psychoactive forms of cannabis for medical use, but otherwise opposes its legalization for recreational and medical purposes. Rubio has said that if elected president he would enforce federal law in states that have legalized cannabis.

Rubio supports setting corporate taxes at 25%, reforming the tax code, and capping economic regulations, and proposes to increase the social security retirement age based on longer life expectancy. He supports expanding public charter schools, opposes Common Core State Standards, and advocates closing the federal Department of Education.

Rubio supported the 2003 invasion of Iraq and military intervention in Libya. Rubio voiced support for a Saudi Arabian-led intervention in Yemen against Houthi rebels. Regarding Iran, he supports tough sanctions, and scrapping the recent nuclear deal; on the Islamic State, he favors aiding local Sunni forces in Iraq and Syria. Rubio says that, because background checks cannot be done under present circumstances, the United States cannot accept more Syrian refugees. He supports working with allies to set up no-fly zones in Syria to protect civilians from Bashar al-Assad. He favors collection of bulk metadata for purposes of national security. He has said that gun control laws consistently fail to achieve their purpose. He is supportive of the Trans Pacific Partnership, saying that the U.S. risks being excluded from global trade unless it is more open to trade. He is wary of China regarding national security and human rights, and wants to boost the U.S. military presence in that region but hopes for greater economic growth as a result of trading with that country. He also believes the U.S. should support democracy, freedom, and true autonomy of the people of Hong Kong. On capital punishment, Rubio favors streamlining the appeals process.

Rubio condemned the genocide of the Rohingya Muslim minority in Myanmar and called for a stronger response to the crisis. Rubio is a staunch supporter of Israel. He is a co-sponsor of a Senate resolution expressing objection to the UN Security Council Resolution 2334, which condemned Israeli settlement building in the occupied Palestinian territories as a violation of international law. Rubio condemned Turkey's wide-ranging crackdown on dissent following a failed July 2016 coup.

At a February 2018 CNN town hall event in the wake of the Stoneman Douglas High School shooting, Rubio defended his record of accepting contributions from the National Rifle Association (NRA), saying, "The influence of these groups comes not from money. The influence comes from the millions of people that agree with the agenda, the millions of Americans that support the NRA."

In March 2018, Rubio defended the decision of the Trump administration to add a citizenship question to the 2020 census. Experts noted that the inclusion of such a question would likely result in severe undercounting of the population and faulty data, as undocumented immigrants would be less likely to respond to the census. Fellow Republican members of Congress from Florida, Ileana Ros-Lehtinen and Mario Diaz-Balart, criticized the Trump administration's decision on the basis that it could lead to a faulty census and disadvantage Florida in terms of congressional apportionment and fund apportionment.

In July 2018, Rubio offered an amendment to a major congressional spending bill to potentially force companies that purchase real estate in cash to disclose their owners as "an attempt to root out criminals who use illicit funds and anonymous shell companies to buy homes".

On August 28, 2018, Rubio and 16 other members of Congress urged the United States to impose sanctions under the Global Magnitsky Act against Chinese officials who are responsible for human rights abuses against the Uyghur Muslim minority in Xinjiang.

Rubio opposed the Affordable Care Act ("Obamacare"). On April 27, 2020, the US Supreme Court voted 8–1 to defeat his attempt to undermine the Act.

In March 2016, Rubio opposed President Obama's nomination of Merrick Garland to the Supreme Court, saying, "I don't think we should be moving forward with a nominee in the last year of this president's term. I would say that even if it was a Republican president." In September 2020, Rubio applauded Trump's nomination of Amy Coney Barrett to the court after Justice Ruth Bader Ginsburg's death, voting to confirm her on October 26, 86 days before the expiration of Trump's presidential term. No Democrat voted for her, nor did Maine's independent Angus King, Republican Susan Collins, or Vermont independent Bernie Sanders.

Rubio has a mixed relationship with Donald Trump. During the Republican primaries in the 2016 presidential election, they harshly criticized each other. But during Trump's presidency, Rubio "[supported] just about everything Trump said and did", according to the Sun-Sentinel.

In May 2021, Rubio argued that "Wall Street must stop enabling Communist China" in The American Prospect and on his website. "Americans from across the political spectrum should feel emboldened by the growing bipartisan awakening to the threat that the CCP poses to American workers, families, and communities", he wrote. "As we deploy legislative solutions to tackle this challenge, Democrats must not allow our corporate and financial sectors’ leftward shift on social issues to blind them to the enormity of China as a geo-economic threat."

Personal life

Rubio is a Roman Catholic and attends Catholic Mass at Church of the Little Flower in Coral Gables, Florida. He also previously attended Christ Fellowship, a Southern Baptist Church in West Kendall, Florida.

In 1998, Rubio married Jeanette Dousdebes, a former bank teller and Miami Dolphins cheerleader, in a Catholic ceremony at the Church of the Little Flower. They have four children. Rubio and his family live in West Miami, Florida.

As of 2018, according to OpenSecrets.org, Rubio's net worth was negative, owing more than $1.8 million.

Electoral history

Writings

Honors
Rubio has been awarded the following foreign honor:

  Commander of the Order of the Star of Romania, Romania (June 8, 2017)

See also

 Hong Kong Human Rights and Democracy Act
 Republican Party presidential candidates, 2016
 Florida Republican primary, 2016
 List of Hispanic and Latino Americans in the United States Congress

References

External links

 Florida House of Representatives – Marco Rubio
 Senator Marco Rubio official U.S. Senate website
 Marco Rubio for U.S. Senate official campaign website
 Public statement on the Impeachment trial of Donald Trump
 
 

|-

|-

|-

|-

|-

|-

|-

|-

|-

|-

 
1971 births
Candidates in the 2016 United States presidential election
21st-century American politicians
21st-century Roman Catholics
American male non-fiction writers
21st-century American memoirists
American political writers
American politicians of Cuban descent
American Roman Catholics
American anti-communists
Articles containing video clips
Christians from Florida
Florida city council members
Florida International University faculty
Florida lawyers
Former Latter Day Saints
Hispanic and Latino American candidates for President of the United States
Hispanic and Latino American members of the United States Congress
Hispanic and Latino American state legislators in Florida
Living people
Commanders of the Order of the Star of Romania
Republican Party United States senators from Florida
Speakers of the Florida House of Representatives
Republican Party members of the Florida House of Representatives
Tea Party movement activists
University of Florida College of Liberal Arts and Sciences alumni
University of Miami School of Law alumni
Writers from Miami
Latino conservatism in the United States